Karandaq (also known as Karanda, Karandāgh, Karandaraq, and Qaranda) is a village in Sanjabad-e Shomali Rural District of the Central District of Kowsar County, Ardabil province, Iran. At the 2006 census, its population was 801 in 167 households. The following census in 2011 counted 816 people in 217 households. The latest census in 2016 showed a population of 502 people in 146 households; it was the largest village in its rural district.

References

External links 
Tageo

Kowsar County

Towns and villages in Kowsar County

Populated places in Ardabil Province

Populated places in Kowsar County